Fisetin (7,3′,4′-flavon-3-ol) is a plant flavonol from the flavonoid group of polyphenols. It can be found in many plants, where it serves as a yellow/ochre colouring agent. It is also found in many fruits and vegetables, such as strawberries, apples, persimmons, onions and cucumbers. Its chemical formula was first described by Austrian chemist Josef Herzig in 1891.

The biological activity of fisetin has been studied in many laboratory assays; like other polyphenols it has many activities.

Biological sources 
Fisetin can be found in a wide variety of plants. It is found in Eudicotyledons, such as trees and shrubs in the family Fabaceae, such as the acacias Acacia greggii and Acacia berlandieri, the parrot tree (Butea frondosa), the honey locust (Gleditsia triacanthos), members of the family Anacardiaceae such as the Quebracho colorado and species of the genus Rhus, which contains the sumacs. Along with myricetin, fisetin provides the color of the traditional yellow dye young fustic, which was extracted from the Eurasian smoketree (Rhus cotinus). Many fruits and vegetables also contain fisetin, including strawberries apples, and grapes. Fisetin can be extracted from fruit and herbal sources in juices, wines, and infusions such as teas. It is also found in Monocotyledons such as onions. It is also present in Pinophyta species such as the yellow cypress (Callitropsis nootkatensis).

Biosynthesis
Fisetin is a flavonoid, which is a polyphenol subgroup.  Flavonoid synthesis begins with the phenylpropanoid pathway, in which phenylalanine, an amino acid, is transformed into 4-coumaroyl-CoA. This is the compound that enters the flavonoid biosynthesis pathway. Chalcone synthase, the first enzyme of this pathway, produces chalcone from 4-coumaroyl-CoA. All flavonoids are derived from this chalcone backbone (this family being the so-called chalconoids). The activity of different enzymes, including isomerases and hydroxylases, alter the backbone depending on the subclass of the flavonoid being produced. Transferases help control changes in the flavonoid's solubility and reactivity by catalyzing the addition of things such as methyl groups and sugars. This allows for controlled fluctuations in physiological activities.
 
Flavonoid biosynthesis gene regulation occurs through the interaction of different transcription factors. Depending on the combination of transcription factor interactions, the structural genes involved in flavonoid biosynthesis are expressed in specific locations of the plant and at specific times. Many myeloblastosis (MYB) transcription factors have been identified in a variety of fruits and plants, including strawberries, maize, and arabidopsis, as being important in the regulation of flavonoid biosynthesis and accumulation. These transcription factors continue to be studied in plant model organisms such as maize and Arabidopsis.

The environment of the plant has also been shown to affect the flavonoid biosynthesis pathway. Shorter wavelengths of light, ranging from blue to UV light, allow for higher production and accumulation of flavonoids in fruits. These wavelengths activate enzymes that are involved in the phenylpropanoid and flavonoid biosynthesis pathways, stimulating the production of flavonoids. The level of stimulation can vary between individual fruits.

Clinical significance

Fisetin, like other polyphenols such as resveratrol, is a sirtuin-activating compound and has been shown in laboratory studies to extend the life of yeast, worms, flies, and mice. Like the other compounds, it has also been shown to be reactive in many different assays of biological activities, raising the possibility that any drug generated from fisetin would have too many side effects to be useful.

Fisetin has shown anti-cancer activity in studies on cells and model animals conducted in laboratories, and appears to block the PI3K/AKT/mTOR pathway, along with other mechanisms to induce apoptosis activation, and prevent apoptosis resistance.

In lab studies fisetin has been shown to be an anti-proliferative agent, interfering with the cell cycle in several ways. Like some other flavonoids, it has been found in lab studies to be a topoisomerase inhibitor, which may turn out to be a carcinogenic activity or an anti-cancer activity; further research is needed.

Fisetin has been shown to be an effective senolytic agent in wild-type mice, with effects of increased lifespan, reduced senescence markers in tissues, and reduced age-related pathologies. Studies of cell cultures of senescent human umbilical vein endothelial cells have shown that fisetin induces apoptosis by inhibition of the anti-apoptotic protein Bcl-xL. Fisetin has roughly twice the senolytic potency as quercetin. A clinical trial in the U.S. was under way as of October 2018 to show effectiveness in humans.

In studies conducted on cells in a laboratory, fisetin inhibits the activity of several pro-inflammatory cytokines, including tumor necrosis factor alpha, interleukin 6, and nuclear factor kappa B (NF-κB). The anti-inflammatory action is due to deacylation of the pro-inflammatory transcription factor NF-κB by sirtuin 1.

Fisetin has been shown in lab studies to upregulate glutathione, an endogenous antioxidant. It has direct activity as a reducing agent, chemically reacting with reactive oxygen species to neutralize them. Studies suggest that it lodges in cell membranes and prevents oxidative damage to lipids in the cell membrane. Like other flavonoids, it has a planar structure, with multiple carbon rings. It scavenges free radicals as a result of its electron-donating capacity, due to the presence of two hydroxyl groups on one ring and a hydroxyl group on another.

In vitro screening has identified fisetin as an antimitotic compound.

References 

17β-Hydroxysteroid dehydrogenase inhibitors
Flavonols
Topoisomerase inhibitors
Catechols
Vinylogous carboxylic acids